Xenomigia premiosa is a moth of the family Notodontidae. It is found in north-eastern Ecuador.

The length of the forewings is 17–18 mm. The ground colour of the forewings is reddish brown, the veins are thinly lined with light orange. The hindwings are translucent light grey brown, becoming darker toward the outer margin.

Etymology
The species name is derived from Latin premiosus (meaning rich) and refers to the deep pockets on female sternum 7.

References

Moths described in 2011
Notodontidae of South America